Çayyolu is a suburb of Ankara, Turkey.

Location and history
The core of the suburb is a former village named Kutuğun situated almost at the center of the Çayyolu suburb. In 1967 the village was renamed Çayyolu. Beginning by the next year, housing projects around the village transformed the rural area into an urban area. Up to 2012, it was a part of Yenimahalle ilçe (district). But in 2012, it was included in the Çankaya ilçe. Today Çayyolu is a modern suburb with parks, shopping malls, supermarkets, restaurants, coffeehouses, cinema halls a sports complex and a theatre named 125th Anniversary Çayyolu Stage.

Population
Currently in addition to Çayyolu there are eight neighborhoods;  Alacaatlı, Dodorga,  Konutkent, Koru,  Mutlukent, Profesör Ahmet Taner Kışlalı, Ümitköy and Yaşamkent all of which collectively are known as Çayyolu.  From east to west Mutlukent, Ümitköy, Koru, Konutkent and Yaşamkent are along the highway. The population of these neighborhoods as of 2015 and 2019 are shown in the table.

Mass transportation
The mass transportation between Ankara centrum and Çayyolu is via Ankara Metro M2. The last three stations of the metro namely, Ümitköy, Çayyolu and Koru are actually within the suburb.

References

Çankaya, Ankara
Populated places in Ankara Province
Suburbs in Asia